Condo may refer to:

 Condo, short for Condominium
 Condo (TV series), American sitcom television series
 Condo hotel, building which is legally a condominium but which is operated as a hotel
 Condo (surname), surname

See also 

 Condominium (disambiguation)